Ringo Starr and Friends is a 2006 live album by rock musician and ex-Beatle Ringo Starr, following his 2005–2006 tour. The album features the tracks from the All-Starr Band's 2001 tour. The album is a budget-release version of the King Biscuit Flower Hour Presents Ringo & His New All-Starr Band album released in 2002, containing the same tracks but omitting "The No No Song" and "Back Off Boogaloo." The album had limited pressing and was only released in Europe. Ringo's friends included on the album are Ian Hunter, Howard Jones, Roger Hodgson, Sheila E, Greg Lake and Mark Rivera.

Track listing
 "Photograph" (George Harrison, Richard Starkey) – 4:21
 "Act Naturally" (Johnny Russell, Voni Morrison) – 2:29
 "All the Young Dudes" – (David Bowie) – 5:35
 "Don't Go Where the Road Don't Go" – (Ringo Starr, Johnny Warman) – 4:34
 "No One Is to Blame" (Howard Jones) – 6:11
 "Yellow Submarine" (Lennon–McCartney) – 3:06
 "The Logical Song" (Rick Davies, Roger Hodgson) – 3:48
 "Glamorous Life" (Prince) – 9:03
 "I Wanna Be Your Man" (Lennon-McCartney) – 3:24
 "Give a Little Bit" (Rick Davies, Roger Hodgson) – 4:20
 "Take the Long Way Home" (Rick Davies, Roger Hodgson) – 4:37
 "You're Sixteen" (Sherman Brothers) – 2:29
 "Lucky Man" (Greg Lake) – 4:41
 "With a Little Help from My Friends" (Lennon–McCartney) – 5:34

Personnel 
Ringo Starr & His All-Starr Band
 Ringo Starr - vocals on 1, 2, 4, 6, 9, 12, 14, drums 
 Roger Hodgson - guitars, vocals on 7, 10, 11
 Ian Hunter - guitars, vocals on 3 
 Greg Lake - bass, acoustic guitar, vocals on 13
 Howard Jones - keyboards, synthesizer solo on 13, vocals on 5
 Sheila E - drums, vocals on 8
 Mark Rivera - flute, saxophone

References

 

2006 live albums
Ringo Starr live albums
Albums produced by Ringo Starr